The People's Liberation Army General Hospital and Medical School (301 Hospital) is the central military medical institution of the People's Liberation Army and the largest comprehensive military hospital in China. 

The 301 Hospital located in Beijing, the largest military hospital is administratively affiliated to the Central Military Commission Joint Logistics Support Force. The hospital consists of eight major medical centers and a branch in Hainan. Its history can be traced back to the Ninggang Maoping Hospital established by the revolutionary army in 1927. The hospital has long been ranked third in the country and is one of the best hospitals in China. The hospital is open to the public.

History 
The General Hospital was formerly the second clinical institute affiliated to Peking Union Medical College, which was changed in October 1953 into a hospital directly affiliated to the military commission of the Central Committee of the Chinese Communist Party. In July 1954, it was renamed as the 301 Hospital of the PLA. In June 1957, the Department of Defense mandated to cancel the appellation of “301 Hospital”, while appointing the name of “the China PLA General Hospital”. PLA Postgraduate Medical School was constructed with support from the China PLA General Hospital. It was founded in November 1958 and closed down in 1962, and in June 1979, it was restored with approval from the military commission. In September 1986, it was formally listed among the universities and colleges of the whole army, with an authorization number. 
In 2004, the 304 Hospital and 309 Hospital of the PLA were renamed respectively as the 304 and 309 Clinical Branches, and publicly referred to as the First and the Second Hospitals affiliated to the China PLA General Hospital, meanwhile listed into the compilation sequence of the China PLA General Hospital.

Notable doctors 
 Jiang Yanyong - past chief Doctor

See also 
 307 Hospital

References 

Buildings and structures in Haidian District
Hospital buildings completed in 1953
People's Liberation Army
Hospitals established in 1953
Hospitals in Beijing
Military hospitals in China
1953 establishments in China